African Regroupment Party (in French: Parti du Regroupement Africain) was a political party in Upper Volta. The interterritorial PRA had established a strong section in Upper Volta in 1958. This party disappeared as the country became a single-party state under the Voltaic Democratic Union (UDV-RDA).

Following the coup of 1966 PRA was reconstituted. It emerged as one of the major political factions. In the 1978 legislative elections it came fourth, thus losing its legal status (the 1977 Constitution limited the number of political parties to three), and subsequently PRA merged into UDV-RDA.

Defunct political parties in Burkina Faso